Ivan Almeida Dias (born 28 August 1972), is a retired Brazilian born Portuguese futsal player who played as a defender for Miramar, Freixieiro, Académica, Boavista and the Portugal national team.

References

External links

1972 births
Living people
Portuguese men's futsal players
Brazilian men's futsal players
AR Freixieiro players
Sportspeople from Niterói